Muscatine is a city in Muscatine County, Iowa, United States. The population was 23,797 at the time of the 2020 census, an increase from 22,697 in 2000.  The county seat of Muscatine County, it is located along the Mississippi River. The local business association states that the name Muscatine is not used by any other community.

Muscatine is the principal city of the Muscatine Micropolitan Statistical Area (2010 census population 54,132)  the estimate was 54,184, which includes all of Muscatine and Louisa counties, making it the 208th-largest micropolitan statistical area.

History 

Muscatine began as a trading post founded by representatives of Colonel George Davenport in 1833. Muscatine was incorporated as Bloomington in 1839; the name was changed to reduce mail delivery confusion, as there were several Bloomingtons in the Midwest. Before that, Muscatine had also been known as "Newburg" and "Casey's Landing".

The origin of the name Muscatine is debated. It may have been derived from the Mascouten Native American tribe. The Mascoutin lived along the Mississippi in the 1700s. In 1819 Muscatine Island was known as Mascoutin Island.

In the 1838 General Land Office map, the town is labelled Musquitine, which may be a variation of Musquakeen, an alternative name for Muscatine Island; Musquakeen may have derived from the Meskwaki indigenous people who lived close by. Major William Williams, who was visiting in 1849 when the town was still called both Bloomington and Muscatine, claimed, "Muscatine in English is Fire Island," in his list of the meanings of Siouan language names.

Williams wrote a brief description of the settlement:

From the 1840s to the Civil War, Muscatine had Iowa's largest black community, consisting of fugitive slaves who had traveled the Mississippi from the South and free blacks who had migrated from the eastern states. One of the most prominent community leaders was Alexander G. Clark Sr., born free in Pennsylvania. He was a barber, a respected position at the time, and eventually became a wealthy timber salesman and real estate speculator. In 1848 he was among the founders of the local African Methodist Episcopal Church, which had been established as the first independent black denomination in the US.

In the antebellum period he assisted fugitive slaves, and petitioned the state government to overturn racist laws before the Civil War. In 1863, Clark helped organize Iowa's black regiment, the 60th United States Colored Infantry (originally known as the 1st Iowa Infantry, African Descent), though an injury prevented him from serving.

In 1868, he gained desegregation of Iowa's public schools by suing the Muscatine school board after his daughter Susan was turned away from her neighborhood school. Eleven years later, in 1879 his son Alexander Jr. became the first black graduate of the University of Iowa College of Law and its first black graduate from any department. Clark Sr. went to the college and became its second black law graduate five years later, despite being 58 years old. He said that he wanted to serve “as an example to young men of his own race.” Clark rose to prominence in the Republican Party, serving as a delegate to state and national conventions.

In 1890, Clark was appointed ambassador to Liberia by President Benjamin Harrison. He was one of four Muscatine residents to be appointed as a diplomatic envoy between 1855 and 1900, a remarkable feat for a town of such small size: George Van Horne was consul at Marseilles, France during the 1860s; Samuel McNutt served at Maracaibo, Venezuela in 1890; and Frank W. Mahin represented his country in Reichenberg, Austria in 1900.

Less than a year after arriving in Liberia, Clark died of fever. His body was returned to the US, where he was buried in Muscatine's Greenwood Cemetery. In 1975 the city moved his former house about 200 feet, to make room for a low-income apartment complex for senior citizens; the latter was named in his honor. The University of Iowa's chapter of the Black Law Students Association (BLSA) is named for the Clarks, as a testament to the accomplishments of father and son, and their places in the history of civil rights in Iowa.

Mark Twain lived in the city briefly during the summer of 1855 while working at the local newspaper, the Muscatine Journal, which was partly owned by his brother, Orion Clemens.

He noted some recollections of Muscatine in his book Life on the Mississippi:

In 1884, J. F. Boepple, a German immigrant, founded a pearl button company. He produced buttons that looked like pearls by machine-punching them from freshwater mussel shells harvested from the Mississippi River. Muscatine's slogan, "Pearl of the Mississippi," refers to the days when pearl button manufacturing by the McKee Button Company was a significant economic contributor. In 1915, Weber & Sons Button Co., Inc. was the world's largest producer of fancy freshwater pearl buttons. From that time forward, Muscatine was known as "The Pearl Button Capital of the World". Weber is still manufacturing today and celebrated its 100-year anniversary in 2004.

Muscatine is nearly as well known as the "Watermelon Capital of the World", a title that reflects the agricultural rural nature of the county.

Muscatine was home to minor league baseball. The Muscatine Muskies was the last moniker of the minor league teams that played in Muscatine from 1910 to 1916. Muscatine was a member of the Northern Association (1910) and Central Association (1911–1916). Baseball Hall of Fame member Sam Rice played for the Muscatine Wallopers in 1912. Muscatine played at League Field, now named "Tom Bruner Field".

Muscatine was the home town and operating location of broadcaster Norman G. Baker, inventor of the calliaphone. In 1925–1931, Baker operated the powerful radio station KTNT, published a newspaper, and operated the Baker Institute, a clinic. He also owned numerous businesses in the town.

Muscatine was formerly a stop on the shared Chicago, Rock Island and Pacific Railroad and Milwaukee Road line. Restructuring of the railroads followed declines in passenger traffic and the Rock Island station was eventually demolished. The two railroads split near the railroad crossing on county highway X61. A portion of the Milwaukee Road's line is extant; it serves business and is used for the storage of rolling stock.

Muscatine was hit by an EF3 tornado on June 1, 2007, which destroyed or damaged areas of the city.

On February 15, 2012, Xi Jinping, Vice President of the People's Republic of China, visited Muscatine. He had previously visited in 1985 as part of a Chinese delegation to learn about American agriculture. He returned to Muscatine when he toured the U.S. in 2012 before becoming president. The visit prompted the public appearance of both supporters and protesters. The latter criticized China's human rights record in Tibet.

In 2017, the 33,000 square foot Sino-U.S. Cultural Center was established for $1 million by Glad Cheng (born 1971), owner of Muscatine Travel and chairman of the China Windows Group Inc.

Geography

Muscatine is primarily located on a series of bluffs and hills at a major west-south bend in the Mississippi River. The river-bend gives the city roughly 260 degrees of riverfront. The "highland" area of the town is divided into three ridge-like hills by Papoose Creek and Mad Creek, each of which flow individually into the Mississippi in downtown Muscatine. The city's main roads follow these ridges and valleys in a radial fashion.

Several large working-class neighborhoods and industrial sectors have been built on what is called "Muscatine Island". This flat, sandy expanse was largely underwater before a portion of the Mississippi River rerouted to follow the course of the present-day Muscatine Slough. It is unclear when the river changed course. The hills, river, and island are all integral to the diversity of Muscatine's economy and housing sector. As the city's urbanized area develops, the areas of highest elevation in the "High Prairie" crescent (between the Cedar and Mississippi Rivers) are increasingly taken from agricultural use and developed as suburban housing.

The key feature of this region is that although the populated areas are non-contiguous, a high percentage of residents commute among the cities for work, particularly those in professional fields.

Climate

Demographics

2010 census
As of the 2010 United States Census there were 22,886 people, 9,008 households, and 5,923 families residing in the city. The racial makeup of the city was 87.8% White, 2.3% African American, 0.5% Native American, 0.8% Asian, 6.4% from other races, and 2.2% from two or more races. Hispanic or Latino people of any race were 16.6% of the population.

There were 9,008 households, of which 34.3% had children under the age of 18 living with them, 46.8% were married couples living together, 13.4% had a female householder with no husband present, 5.5% had a male householder with no wife present, and 34.2% were non-families. 28.0% of all households were made up of individuals, and 11.4% had someone living alone who was 65 years of age or older. The average household size was 2.50 and the average family size was 3.04.

The median age in the city was 36.1 years. 26.4% of residents were under the age of 18; 8.6% were between the ages of 18 and 24; 25.7% were from 25 to 44; 25.7% were from 45 to 64; and 13.6% were 65 years of age or older. The gender makeup of the city was 49.1% male and 50.9% female.

2000 census
As of the 2000 United States Census, there were 22,697 people, 8,923 households, and 6,040 families residing in the city. The racial makeup of the city was 90.40% White, 1.08% African American, 0.37% Native American, 0.65% Asian, 0.03% Pacific Islander, 6.04% from other races, and 1.44% from two or more races. Hispanic or Latino people of any race were 12.30% of the population.

There were 8,923 households, out of which 33.4% had children under the age of 18 living with them, 52.7% were married couples living together, 11.0% had a female householder with no husband present, and 32.3% were non-families. 27.4% of all households were made up of individuals, and 11.4% had someone living alone who was 65 years of age or older. The average household size was 2.49 and the average family size was 3.04.

Age spread: 26.4% under the age of 18, 9.2% from 18 to 24, 28.6% from 25 to 44, 21.9% from 45 to 64, and 14.0% who were 65 years of age or older. The median age was 36 years. For every 100 females, there were 94.7 males. For every 100 females age 18 and over, there were 90.2 males.

The median income for a household in the city was $38,122, and the median income for a family was $45,366. Males had a median income of $36,440 versus $23,953 for females. The per capita income for the city was $19,483. About 8.0% of families and 10.9% of the population were below the poverty line, including 13.2% of those under age 18 and 9.6% of those age 65 or over.

Economy
Companies in Muscatine include Bridgestone Bandag, H. J. Heinz Company, The Raymond Corporation Carver Pump, Bayer, the Kent Corporation with its subsidiaries: Kent Nutrition Group, Grain Processing Corporation and Kent Pet Group, Musco Lighting and Stanley Consultants. The Musser Lumber Company was one of Iowa's pioneer lumber concerns.

Headquartered in Muscatine, The HNI Corporation designs and manufactures office furniture including chairs, filing cabinets, workstations, tables, desks and educational furniture under various brand names The HON Company, Allsteel, HBF, Artcobell, Paoli, Gunlocke, Maxon, Lamex, bpergo, and Midwest Folding Products.

Environmental problems
Grain Processing Corp. (GPC) has been known to pollute the air by emitting small particles from its coal burning, acetaldehyde as a byproduct from corn ethanol processing, and also lead. "The plant released more lead than any other plant in Iowa, according to DNR data. It emitted more acetaldehyde – a probable carcinogen chemically similar to formaldehyde – than almost any plant in the country." In 2006 GPC had to pay a $538,000 fine for violating the hourly operating limit for years. In July 2015 the company moved from coal to natural gas as their fuel source. 

The Muscatine Area Resource Recovery for Vehicles and Energy program (MARRVE) is building a food waste collection station for the anaerobic digesters at the municipal wastewater facility. MARRVE is expected to open in 2020, and will generate biogas for vehicles and biosolids for fertilizer, while also reducing local methane emissions.

Points of interest 

Riverfront (which includes the Pearl City Station, Riverview Center, Riverside Park, and "Mississippi Harvest" sculpture by Erik Blome)
Mark Twain Scenic Overlook
Kent Stein Park (which includes historic Tom Bruner Field)
Weed Park and Aquatic Center
Muscatine Community Stadium and the nearby Pearl City Rugby field
Muscatine History and Industry Center
Muscatine Art Center, including Musser Mansion and the Stanley Gallery
Weed Mansion, Alexander G. Clark House, and many other historic homes dating back to the mid-19th century
Two historic districts (Downtown and West Hill) are listed on the National Register of Historic Places
Discovery Park and Environmental Learning Center
W. Joseph Fuller House
St. Mathias Catholic Church
Sinnett Octagon House
Pearl Button Museum
 Former Muscatine North & South Railway Depot on the riverfront (referred to locally as the Red Brick Building)

Education

Muscatine Community School District is home to Muscatine High School, which has the athletic teams under the name Muscatine Muskies. The district covers almost all of the city limits. A small portion of the city limits is within the Louisa–Muscatine Community School District.

Muscatine is home to Muscatine Community College and the MCC Cardinals.

Media

Print

The Muscatine Journal newspaper circulates daily Monday through Saturday throughout the Muscatine area and on muscatinejournal.com. Established in 1840, the Muscatine Journal was once owned by Mark Twain's brother, Orion Clemens, and Twain wrote for the paper during his time in Muscatine. Today, the publication and its weekly shopper Hometown Extra are owned by Lee Enterprises.

The Voice of Muscatine, a publication of Jam Media Solutions, has been an operation newspaper since October 28, 2015. It is a county-wide publication, servicing Muscatine County.

Radio
Jam Media Solutions, LLC. has two radio stations in Muscatine; KWPC-AM has been a long part of the city's history, and KMCS-FM has been in the community since 1996.

Residents also receive radio broadcasts from stations in the Quad Cities, Iowa City, Cedar Rapids, Burlington, Waterloo, and Aledo, Illinois (WRMJ).

Television
Muscatine and Muscatine County are part of the Quad Cities Television Market. As such, all broadcast stations from this market are available both over-the-air and on pay television providers such as cable television and satellite television. Depending on location, terrain, and type of antenna used, some Muscatine area residents can also receive television signals from Cedar Rapids–Waterloo, and the Iowa side of the Ottumwa–Kirksville market.

Transportation

Muscatine is located along two designated routes of Iowa's "Commercial-Industrial Network", U.S. Highway 61 and Iowa Highway 92. Highway 61 serves as a major agricultural-industry route to the south from Burlington to Muscatine, where it becomes a heavy-industrial and major commuter route to the northeast between Muscatine and Davenport. In conjunction with Iowa 92, which provides access to the Avenue of the Saints (U.S. 218/IA 27) to the west and the lightly populated western Illinois via the Norbert Beckey Bridge to the east, Highway 61 serves as a shortcut for traffic from northeastern Missouri and southeastern Iowa en route to the Quad Cities, Chicago, and points beyond. Several regional highway improvement projects are in the works to further establish and capitalize on this trade-route. Additionally, Muscatine is connected to Interstate 80 to the north by fifteen miles of Iowa Highway 38. Iowa Highway 22 also connects with U.S. 218/IA 27 to the west, and Davenport to the east.

Notable people

Lee Allen, medical illustrator
Norman G. Baker (1882–1958), inventor of the Calliaphone; established Know the Naked Truth (KTNT), a border blaster radio station
Jack Barlow, country music singer
Terry Beatty, artist; penciler and inker in the comic book industry
Ellis Parker Butler, author
Roy James Carver, industrialist and philanthropist
Alexander Clark, diplomat; United States Ambassador to Liberia
David C. Cloud, Iowa Attorney General and state legislator
Max Allan Collins, crime novelist, co-creator of the graphic novel Road to Perdition (filmed by Sam Mendes) and writer/director of the movie Mommy, which was filmed in Muscatine's Wood Creek neighborhood in 1995
Al Gould, Major League Baseball player for the Cleveland Indians
Scot Halpin, fan who filled in on drums with the Who when Keith Moon collapsed during a performance
Tom Hearst, NASCAR national racing champion
Jim Yong Kim (born 1959), co-founder and executive director of Partners In Health; president of Dartmouth College; president of The World Bank
Sarah Lacina, contestant on reality TV show Survivor: Cagayan; winner of Survivor: Game Changers
Hattie Horner Louthan (1865 – 1950), writer
Ralph P. Lowe, fourth governor of Iowa
Emmett Lynn, actor
James Bradley Orman, former governor of Colorado
Dame Margherita Roberti, opera singer; spent much of her childhood in Muscatine and graduated from Muscatine High School.
W. R. Schoemaker (1863–1937), Baptist pastor
C. Maxwell Stanley, engineer, entrepreneur, and delegate to the United Nations
Phil Vischer, founder of the Christian media companies Big Idea Entertainment and Jellyfish Labs
Murray Wier, University of Iowa basketball star, NBA player
Joe Wieskamp, University of Iowa Basketball player and NBA draft pick

Twin towns – sister cities
Muscatine's sister cities are:

 Drohobych, Ukraine
 Ichikawamisato, Japan
 Kislovodsk, Russia
 Łomża, Poland
 Ludwigslust, Germany

 Ramallah, Palestine
 Zhengding, China

Notes

References

External links
 

 Muscatine Chamber of Commerce
 

 
Cities in Iowa
Muscatine, Iowa micropolitan area
County seats in Iowa
Populated places established in 1833
1833 establishments in Michigan Territory
Iowa populated places on the Mississippi River